Fairpark station is a light rail station in Salt Lake City, Utah, served by the Green Line of the Utah Transit Authority's (UTA) TRAX system. The Green Line provides service from the Salt Lake International Airport to West Valley City (via Downtown Salt Lake City and connects with the rest of the TRAX system, as well as UTA's FrontRunner commuter rail and S Line streetcar.

Description 
The station is located at 1150 West North Temple Street (just south of the Utah State Farigrounds), with the island platform is located in the median of the street.  Although not open yet, this station will have a Park and Ride lot with a yet to be announced number of spaces. Like many other UTA stations, this station has art work included in its design. The art work for the Fairpark station is murals that include various images depicting the history of the area. The set of murals is called Fairpark Convergence and was designed by Nancy Gutkin O’Neil of New Orleans, Louisiana. The station is part of a railway right of way that was created specifically for the Green Line. The station opened on 14 April 2013 and is operated by the Utah Transit Authority. It is also one of four TRAX stations (all of which are located the north end of the Green Line) that is powered by solar panels located on top of the station's canopy through a project which was initially funded in part by Rocky Mountain Power.

References 

TRAX (light rail) stations
Railway stations in the United States opened in 2013
Railway stations in Salt Lake City
2013 establishments in Utah